Yongding Town is a town that the southeastern corner of Mentougou District, Beijing, China. It borders Longquan Town, Dayu and Guangning Subdistricts in the north, Gucheng Subdistrict in the east, Wangzuo Town and Beigong Town in the south, Tanzhesi Town in the west, and has an exclave north of Tanzhesi Town. It had 106,112 people living within its borders as of 2020.

The area was named Yongding after the Yongding River that passes through it.

History

Administrative Divisions 
As of 2021, Yongding Area had direct jurisdiction over 51 subdivisions, of which 27 were communities and 24 were villages:

Landmark 

 Jietai Temple

See also 

 List of township-level divisions of Beijing

References 

Mentougou District
Towns in Beijing